Tverrfjellet may refer to:

 Tverrfjellet (Skjåk), a mountain in Skjåk municipality in Innlandet county, Norway
 Tverrfjellet (Dovre), a mountain in Dovre municipality in Innlandet county, Norway
 Tverrfjellet (Vang), a mountain in Vang municipality in Innlandet county, Norway